Nandanoori Mukesh Kumar (born 16 April 1970), also known as Mukesh Kumar Nandanoori, is an Indian field hockey player. He was born in Hyderabad, Andhra Pradesh.

Career
He made his international debut for the Men's National Team in early 1992. Nicknamed Murali, Kumar represented his native country at three consecutive Summer Olympics, starting in 1992 in Barcelona, Spain, where India finished in seventh place.
Mukesh represented for India in 307 international matches and scored 80 goals.  In the 1992 Barcelona Olympics he scored four goals, in the 1996 Atlanta Olympics he scored two goals, and in the 2000 Sydney Olympics he netted two goals.

Awards 
 Arjuna Award - 1995
 Padma Shri - 2003

Personal life 
Mukesh Kumar is also married to a hockey player, Nidhi Khullar. They have 2 children, N.Yeshaswini and Ashutosh Kumar
Ashutosh Kumar was born in 2008 ,he studies in Kendriya Vidyalaya Picket

References

External links
 

1970 births
Living people
Indian male field hockey players
Field hockey players at the 1992 Summer Olympics
Field hockey players at the 1994 Asian Games
Field hockey players at the 1996 Summer Olympics
Field hockey players at the 1998 Asian Games
1998 Men's Hockey World Cup players
Field hockey players at the 2000 Summer Olympics
Olympic field hockey players of India
Sportspeople from Hyderabad, India
Recipients of the Padma Shri in sports
Recipients of the Arjuna Award
Field hockey players from Andhra Pradesh
Asian Games medalists in field hockey
Asian Games gold medalists for India
Asian Games silver medalists for India
Medalists at the 1994 Asian Games
Medalists at the 1998 Asian Games